GloboNews is a Brazilian news-based pay television channel, owned by Canais Globo, a division of Grupo Globo.

The channel was relaunched on 18 October 2010 with a new logo and a new slogan "Nunca desliga!" (Never turns off!") and more in-depth coverage, especially during daytime.

A high-definition simulcast was launched on 3 February 2013.

Programming 
Programming on GloboNews currently uses generic graphics (except for most repeats of Rede Globo programming) and was color-coded until March 2012, with red for newscasts, green for talk shows, purple for news features, gray for specials and archive programming and blue for repeats of Globo programming. Currently, all programs (except Rede Globo repeats, who still use the color blue) use the color red.

Repeats of Rede Globo's shows

External links 
  

Television stations in Brazil
Portuguese-language television stations in Brazil
Television channels and stations established in 1996
Grupo Globo subsidiaries
Globosat
Companies based in Rio de Janeiro (city)
24-hour television news channels in Brazil
Mass media in Rio de Janeiro (city)
1996 establishments in Brazil